Don Duncalfe (born c. 1939) is a retired Canadian football player who played for the Edmonton Elks.

References

1930s births
Living people
Players of Canadian football from Alberta
Canadian football tackles
Edmonton Elks players
People from Wetaskiwin